Village Gul Hassan Chhalgri is community village, located in union council Hatri Taluka Hyderabad in the Pakistan province of Sindh. This village has a Government Boys Primary School Gul Hassan Chhalgri.

References

Villages in Sindh
Hyderabad District, Pakistan